Mats Wilander was the defending champion, but lost in the final this year.

John McEnroe won the title, defeating Wilander 6–2, 3–6, 6–2 in the final.

Seeds

  John McEnroe (champion)
  Jimmy Connors (semifinals)
  Mats Wilander (final)
  Anders Järryd (semifinals)
  Henrik Sundström (second round)
  Joakim Nyström (quarterfinals)
  Jimmy Arias (second round)
  Johan Kriek (quarterfinals)
  Tomáš Šmíd (third round)
  Vitas Gerulaitis (second round)
  Gene Mayer (second round)
  Juan Aguilera (second round)
  Stefan Edberg (second round)
  José Higueras (second round)
  Francesco Cancellotti (second round)
  Libor Pimek (third round)

Draw

Finals

Top half

Section 1

Section 2

Bottom half

Section 3

Section 4

External links
 ATP main draw

Stockholm Open
1984 Grand Prix (tennis)